Enrique Deichler (1882 – 12 April 1964) was a Chilean equestrian. He competed in the individual jumping event at the 1912 Summer Olympics.

References

External links
 

1882 births
1964 deaths
Chilean male equestrians
Olympic equestrians of Chile
Equestrians at the 1912 Summer Olympics
Sportspeople from Santiago
20th-century Chilean people